Nottingham Girls' High School is a private day school for girls aged 4–18, situated just north of Nottingham city centre. The school was founded in 1875 and forms part of the Girls' Day School Trust.

History
Nottingham Girls' High School was founded on 14 September 1875 by the Girls' Public Day School Company (now the Girls' Day School Trust). It was among the first such schools opened outside London.

Before the 1870s, education for girls in Nottingham was fixed by social class, with limited opportunities for working-class girls to receive any post-primary schooling. Much of the development in girls' education was due to the work of feminist reformers. Nottingham Girls' High School was originally in Nottingham's Oxford Street, with Mrs Bolton as Headmistress, before relocating to its current location in Arboretum Street, in a building that had been a lace manufacturer's house. When it first opened, it had 34 pupils, but by the time of its relocation that had increased to 146.

The outbreak of the Second World War in 1939 caused the school to move to two separate locations: Ramsdale Park and Daybrook. The Arboretum Street buildings were used to accommodate the South Notts Hussars until 1944–1945, when the school was able to move back. Ten years later, as the school celebrated its 80th anniversary, the number of pupils reached 800.

The 1970s saw significant building expansion at the school and in 1975 the school marked its centenary. On 18 May 1973, the Milford Building was officially opened by the Duchess of Gloucester and in 1978, the Duke of Edinburgh opened the Edinburgh Library.

In 1995, a house system was introduced and named after the first four headmistresses of the school: Bolton, Hastings, Luxton and Skeel. The Bowering Sports Hall was opened by Richard Bacon in 1998 and eleven years later, in May 2009, the new Sixth Form Centre opened. In 2016 the old dining hall building was demolished and replaced by a performing arts centre known as The Space, and named The Squire Performing Arts Centre, after an alumna, Dame Rosemary Squire.

In 2020, a nursery was opened by the education innovator Shonette Bason-Wood.

Over its history, the school has been headed by 13 headmistresses and one acting headmistress. Julie Keller is the current headmistress.

Facilities
Originally placed in a group of Victorian houses, the school has since expanded considerably. Its performing arts centre, The Space, where the old dining hall and uniform shop were, is used for music and drama productions at the school and can be hired for non-school conferences, meetings and performances. It provides a source of education for girls interested in aspects of the performing arts and theatre production work, from music to lighting.

There is a Sixth Form Centre adjoining The Space, with modern classrooms, a kitchen area and tuck shop, and an outside garden and decking area. There are two libraries – one in the Senior School and one in the Junior School – along with a lecture theatre, drama studio, music building, dining hall, and common rooms for the lower and upper schools. The Infant and Junior schools are on the same site, but based in the buildings on Balmoral Road.

In recent years, the school has invested in IT provision and training. Girls from Year 4 upwards are issued with a personal iPad; younger girls share iPad facilities. Classrooms have interactive whiteboards and there is digital equipment for use across the curriculum, such as cameras and microscopes. DT and food rooms have been refurbished to include a 3D printer, among other high-tech equipment.

The school grounds include all-weather courts, grass pitches, a gymnasium, and a sports hall and fitness suite. The outdoor learning area comprises a climbing wall. Upnah Wood has plentiful outdoor learning equipment, such as low ropes, a fire pit and a pizza oven.

Houses
The four school houses are named after the four first headmistresses of the school; Bolton, Hastings, Luxton and Skeel. In recent years, the Junior School has also adopted the House system, so that girls can be in the same House as siblings further up the school. The House system includes inter-house competitions and sports events.

Academic structure
There were 738 students in the 2019–2020 academic year, of whom 151 were in the sixth form (studying for advanced certificate examinations). The sixth form is overseen by a Head of Sixth Form. There are usually around 280 girls in the Junior School, which has its own Head. Nottingham Girls' High School is among the largest of the 23 schools and 2 academies run through the Girls' Day School Trust, which has promoted education of girls since its foundation in 1872.

Student Leadership 
A team of committed Sixth Formers are appointed to a range of positions each year. This includes a Head Girl and two Deputy Head Girls, who work closely with the Senior Leadership Team on a range of projects and strategies. Included in this group is a series of Prefect House Captains who oversee all House events.

Notable alumnae

Julia Bell (1879–1979), geneticist
Gina Birch (living), bass player with The Raincoats
Helen Cooper (born 1947), literary scholar
Helen Cresswell (1934–2005), children's author
Janice Elliott (1931–1995), novelist, journalist and children's writer
Muriel Glauert (1892–1949) mathematician who made significant contributions to early advances in aerodynamics.
Helen Karagounis (born 1981), née Thieme, 2004 Olympic relay runner
Sudha Kheterpal (living), percussionist
Clare Hammond (born 1985), concert pianist
Julie Myerson (born 1960), author and writer for the Financial Times
Stella Rimington (born 1935), Director-General of MI5
Indhu Rubasingham (living), theatre director
June Spencer (born 1919), actress (The Archers)
Rosemary Squire (born 1956), theatre owner and entrepreneur
Janet Whitaker, Baroness Whitaker (born 1936), Labour Party politician and Life Peer
Molly Whittington-Egan (1924–2016), writer

References

External links
School Website
Profile on the ISC website
Profile on the GDST website
Profile at MyDaughter

Girls' schools in Nottinghamshire
Educational institutions established in 1875
Schools of the Girls' Day School Trust
Member schools of the Girls' Schools Association
Private schools in Nottingham
1875 establishments in England